Aníbal Rodríguez Herrera (1868 - c.1930) was a Chilean political figure, who served several times as minister.

He was born the son of Juan Esteban Rodríguez Segura and of Ignacia Herrera. While he was still a university student, from 1886 to 1891, he worked as a civil servant on the Ministry of the Interior. He graduated as a lawyer from the Universidad de Chile on January 9, 1891. He married Rosa Velasco Martínez, and after her death, he married for a second time her sister, Graciela Velasco Martínez.

In 1895 he was named secretary of the Council of State, position he held until 1899, when he became a temporary under-secretary of the Interior, where he worked very closely with future President Pedro Montt. Between 1901 and 1902, he was also Intendant of Tarapacá. While there, he also worked as a teacher at the Liceo de Iquique. In 1902, he returned to his former position at the ministry, which he maintained until 1906, when he resigned his position in order to run for Congress.

He joined Montt's National Party and was elected a deputy for Temuco and Imperial (1906-1909). President Pedro Montt appointed him Minister of War and Navy on August 29, 1908, a position he maintained until January 22, 1909. He was reelected as a deputy but this time for "Concepción, Talcahuano, Lautaro and Coelemu" (1909-1912), and elected first vice-president of the Chamber of Deputies on June 2, 1909. President Montt reappointed him as Minister of War and Navy on September 15, 1909, and he remained so until June 25 of the following year.

President Ramón Barros Luco appointed him once more as Minister of War and Navy, a position he held from June 11 to August 15, 1911; and President Juan Luis Sanfuentes once again appointed him between September 23 and November 11, 1919.  On March 28, 1912, he was elected President of the Chamber of Deputies, and reelected three more times as a deputy for "Concepción, Talcahuano, Lautaro and Coelemu" (1912-1915), (1915-1918) and (1918-1921). He was reelected for the final time as a deputy for "Constitución, Cauquenes y Chanco" (1921-1924).

On January 12, 1923, President Arturo Alessandri appointed him Minister of Finance, position he held until March 16 of the same year. He retired from politics in 1925 in order to take over as Public Registrar of Properties in Santiago, where he died.

External links
Official biography 

1868 births
1930 deaths
Politicians from Santiago
Chilean people of Spanish descent
National Party (Chile, 1857) politicians
Chilean Ministers of Defense
Deputies of the XXVIII Legislative Period of the National Congress of Chile
Deputies of the XXIX Legislative Period of the National Congress of Chile
Deputies of the XXX Legislative Period of the National Congress of Chile
Deputies of the XXXI Legislative Period of the National Congress of Chile
Deputies of the XXXII Legislative Period of the National Congress of Chile
Deputies of the XXXIII Legislative Period of the National Congress of Chile
University of Chile alumni